Il était une fois... les Explorateurs (English Once Upon a Time... The Explorers) is a French animated TV series from 1997. It was directed by Albert Barillé. It is part of the Once Upon a Time... franchise.

Episodes
The First Navigators
Alexander the Great
Erik the Red and the Discovery of America
Genghis Khan
Ibn Battuta (in Marco Polo's footsteps)
The Great Junks
Vasco da Gama
The Taxis and the first Postal System
The Pinzon Brothers (The Hidden Side of Christopher Columbus)
Amerigo Vespucci
Ferdinand Magellan and del Cano
Cabeza de Vaca
Vitus Bering
Louis Antoine de Bougainville and the Pacifique
Bruce and the Nile
Charles Marie de La Condamine
James Cook
Alexander von Humboldt
Lewis and Clark Expedition
Stuart & Burke and Australia
Stanley & Livingstone
Roald Amundsen, Robert Falcon Scott and the South Pole
Alexandra David-Néel in Tibet
Piccard from the Mountain Tops to the Depth of the Sea
Up to the Peaks
Up to the Stars

See also
 List of French animated television series

External links
Official website for Procidis, the series' producer

 Hello Maestro at YouTube

1996 French television series debuts
1996 French television series endings
Historical television series
French children's animated adventure television series
1990s French animated television series
Television series set in ancient history
Television series set in the Middle Ages
Television series set in the Renaissance
Television series set in the 15th century
Television series set in the 16th century
Television series set in the 17th century
Television series set in the 18th century
Television series set in the 19th century
Television series set in the 20th century
Canal+ original programming
Cultural depictions of Alexander the Great
Cultural depictions of Erik the Red
Cultural depictions of Vasco da Gama
Depictions of Genghis Khan on television
Cultural depictions of James Cook
Cultural depictions of Ferdinand Magellan
Cultural depictions of David Livingstone
Cultural depictions of Henry Morton Stanley
Cultural depictions of Christopher Columbus
Cultural depictions of Meriwether Lewis and William Clark
Cultural depictions of Robert Falcon Scott
Cultural depictions of Roald Amundsen